Pyrococcus is a genus of Thermococcaceaen archaean.

Description and significance 
Pyrococcus has similar characteristics of other thermoautotrophican archaea such as Archaeoglobus, and Methanococcus in the respect that they are all thermophilic and anaerobic. Pyrococcus differs, however, because its optimal growth temperature is nearly 100 °C and dwells at a greater sea depth than the other archaea. Studying Pyrococcus helps give insight to possible mechanisms used to endure extreme environmental conditions like high temperatures and high pressure.

Phylogeny

Genome structure 
Three of the Pyrococcus species have been sequenced. P. furiosus is the largest containing 1.9Mb followed by P. abyssi with 1.8Mb and P. horikoshii with 1.7Mb. The genomes encode for many different metabolic enzymes which gives themselves a wider spectrum of living conditions because they can transport and metabolize a wide range of organic substances. Variation was detected between species as well.

Cell structure and metabolism 
The cells of Pyrococcus are about 0.8–2 μm and are slightly irregular cocci in shape. They show a polar grouping of flagella and are enveloped by an S-layer enclosing a periplasmic space around the cytoplasmic membrane. Pyrococcus species are anaerobic but vary slightly concerning their metabolism. Peptide fermentation is the principle metabolic pathway however, growth has been observed for P. furiosus and P. abyssi on starch, maltose, and pyruvate but not for P. horikoshii. While the presence of elemental sulfur is not needed for growth, growth is enhanced with the addition of So.

Ecology 
Pyrococcus species inhabit environments with extremely high temperatures such as Hydrothermal vents. Optimal growth conditions include a pH level of about 7, a salt concentration around 2.5%, and a temperature around 98 °C. Growing in temperatures this high, it is easy to see why they are anaerobic since at these boiling temperatures hardly any oxygen will be available. In the example of Hydrothermal vents, where P. abyssi has been found, there is no sunlight and the pressure is around 200 atm in addition to the extremely high temperature.

References

Further reading

Scientific journals

Scientific books

Scientific databases

External links

Archaea genera